Paula Cristina Woyzechowsky Gutiérrez is a Venezuelan actress, who debuted on 1991 on La Pandilla de los 7. She has worked on television, theater and film.

Biography 
Woyzechowsky was born in Caracas, Venezuela. At age 12 she debuted on the television series La Pandilla de los 7, produced by RCTV, and on 2001 she participated on the sitcom Planeta de 6, produced by Televen. Woyzechowsky has appeared on several telenovelas on Venevisión, starting on 2006 with Ciudad Bendita, followed by Arroz con leche on 2007, La vida entera on 2008, El árbol de Gabriel on 2011, and Mi ex me tiene ganas on 2012.

Woyzechowsky starred in the movies 3 Hijos y un Vestido in 2007, and Días de Poder in 2010.

On 2012 she participated in La Ratonera, a Spanish adaptation of The Mousetrap, produced by Nohely Arteaga and Catherina Cardozo.

Telenovelas

Series

Theater 
La Fábula del Insomnio
Amor Maternal
La Más Fuerte
El País de Caramelo
Santa Claus en Apuros
Usted tiene ojos de mujer fatal
El Diario de Ana Frank
Ely
Intervalo
Caja de Agua
Instintos
El Público
Así Que Pasen Cinco Años
Las Mil y Una Noches
La Ratonera

Film 
3 Hijos y un Vestido (2007)
Días de Poder (2010)

References

External links

Year of birth missing (living people)
Living people
Venezuelan stage actresses
Venezuelan film actresses
Venezuelan telenovela actresses